Mailen Auroux and María Irigoyen were the defending champions, having won the event in 2012, but both players decided not to participate in 2013.

Laura Thorpe and Stephanie Vogt won the title, defeating Petra Krejsová and Tereza Smitková in the final, 7–6(7–5), 7–5.

Seeds

Draw

References 
 Draw

Save Cup - Doubles
Save Cup
2013 in Italian tennis